Euthalia anosia, the grey baron, is a butterfly of the family Nymphalidae (Limenitidinae). It is found in the Indomalayan realm.<ref>[http://ftp.funet.fi/pub/sci/bio/life/insecta/lepidoptera/ditrysia/papilionoidea/nymphalidae/limenitidinae/euthalia/ " Euthalia  " Hübner, [1819"] at Markku Savela's Lepidoptera and Some Other Life Forms</ref>

SubspeciesE. a. anosia Assam, Burma, Thailand, YunnanE. a. phernes Fruhstorfer, 1913  SikkimE. a. saitaphernes Fruhstorfer, 1913 SikkimE. a. yenadora Fruhstorfer, 1913  JavaE. a. bunaya Fruhstorfer, 1913  Peninsular Malaya, SumatraE. a. dodanda Fruhstorfer, 1913 MalayE. a. yapola Fruhstorfer, 1913  BorneoE. a. pagiana Corbet, 1942  Mentawei IslandE. a. mindanaensis Schröder & Treadaway, 1978  Philippines (Mindanao)E. a. yao'' Yoshino, 1997 Guanxi

References

Butterflies described in 1857
anosia